She and the Three may refer to:

 She and the Three (1922 film), a German silent comedy film
 She and the Three (1935 film), a German comedy crime film